Chasmoptera superba is an insect in the spoonwing family (Nemopteridae). endemic to Western Australia.

It was first described in 1925 by Robert John Tillyard. 

The adults are diurnal flying insects. The larvae are predatory.

References

External links
Chasmoptera superba: images & occurrence data from GBIF

Insects of Australia
Nemopteridae
Insects described in 1925
Taxa named by Robert John Tillyard